David P. Kingdon (1934–2021) was a British pastor. He served as principal of the Irish Baptist College from 1964 to 1974.

Kingdom attended Spurgeon's Orphanage, and was converted in 1949. He studied at the Reigate Grammar School, Peterhouse, Cambridge and Spurgeon's College and served as a pastor before his appointment to the Irish Baptist College.

Kingdon was a Reformed Baptist. He wrote Children of Abraham: A Reformed Baptist View of the Covenants. J. Douma notes that Kingdon's view is a distinctly Reformed defence of believer's baptism: "He wants to adopt the Reformed standpoint by not cutting the ties between the Old and New Testament."

References

1934 births
2021 deaths
Alumni of Peterhouse, Cambridge
Alumni of Spurgeon's College
Converts to Christianity
British Baptist ministers
Seminary presidents
People associated with the Irish Baptist College
People educated at Reigate Grammar School